Saltram House is a grade I listed George II era mansion house located in the parish of Plympton, near Plymouth in Devon, England. It was deemed by the architectural critic Pevsner to be "the most impressive country house in Devon". The house was designed by the architect Robert Adam, who altered and greatly expanded the original Tudor house on two occasions. The drawing room is considered one of Adam's finest interiors. Saltram is one of Britain's best preserved examples of an early Georgian house and retains much of its original decor, plasterwork and furnishings. It contains the Parker family's large collection of paintings, including several by Sir Joshua Reynolds (1723-1792), born and educated at Plympton and a friend of the Parker family.

The present building was commenced by John Parker (1703–1768) of nearby Boringdon Hall, Plympton, and of Court House North Molton, both in Devon, together with his wife Catherine Poulett (1706-1758), a daughter of John Poulett, 1st Earl Poulett. It was completed by his son John Parker, 1st Baron Boringdon (1735-1788), whose son was John Parker, 1st Earl of Morley (1772-1840). The Parker family had risen to prominence in the mid-16th century as the bailiff of the manor of North Molton, Devon, under Baron Zouche of Haryngworth.

In 1957 Saltram House was donated by the Parker family to the  National Trust in lieu of death duties, and is open to the public.

Saltram House was used as one of several local settings for the 1995 film Sense and Sensibility.

Etymology

The name Saltram derives itself from the salt that was harvested on the nearby estuary and the fact that a "ham", or homestead, was on the site before the Tudor period.

History

The first recorded family to have owned the house is that of Mayhew (alias Mayes, Mayhowes, etc.) who were yeoman farmers in the 16th century. The family owned Saltram for about 50 years, their prosperity declining at the end of the century when they began to sell and lease parts of the estate. Their landholdings were considerable — for example, a lease granted by them in 1588 granted the right to farm in Saltram Wood "and all houses, quays and buildings adjoining or upon the same", and to have fishing rights at Laira Bridge Rock and Culverhole; to hold portions of a quay called Coldharbour; and to have the use of the Mayhowes' fishing nets.

The next family to own Saltram were the Baggs, who were probably responsible for turning the farmhouse into a mansion. Sir James I Bagg, MP for Plymouth (1601–11) and Mayor of Plymouth, purchased Saltram in about 1614. On his death the house passed to his son James II Bagg (died 1638), Deputy Governor of Plymouth and a vice-admiral closely allied to the Duke of Buckingham, a favourite of King James I. He is believed twice to have embezzled funds from the Crown, the first occasion having contributed to the failure of Buckingham's attack on Cadiz in 1625. For reason unknown King Charles I twice defended him despite his seemingly obvious culpability. James II Bagg died in 1638 and was succeeded by his son George Bagg, when Saltram was described as comprising "One great mansion house, one stable, three gardens, two acres of orchard, eight acres of meadows" and eight acres more. Despite inheriting his father's role as Deputy Governor of Plymouth, George Bagg did not share his father's luck, and having chosen the Royalist side in the Civil War, Saltram suffered at the hands of the Parliamentarian forces. Following the defeat of the Royalist cause, shortly after 1643 he was forced to compound in the sum of £582 to secure his landholdings.

Despite having held on to Saltram through the Civil War, the Baggs lost Saltram in 1660, shortly before the Restoration of the Monarchy when the Commonwealth government transferred it to the former Parliamentarian captain Henry Hatsell in payment of a large debt owed by Bagg. However, after the Restoration of the Monarchy in 1660, Hatsell was stripped of the house and estate which were granted to Sir George Carteret in settlement of a loan he had made to the King during the Civil War.

In 1712 George Parker of Boringdon Hall, about 2 miles north of Saltram, purchased the manor of Saltram, and created the Parker dynasty which reigned over Saltram until its days as a private estate were over.

Development

Inheritance

John Parker inherited the house in 1743 and along with his wealthy wife, Lady Catherine Parker, (who largely funded the remodelling), clothed the building with symmetrical Palladian facades which cover the Tudor origins of the house. The interiors of the house were given delicate touches including Rococo ceiling plasterwork in the Entrance Hall, Morning Room and Velvet Drawing Room.

John Parker the second, (Lord Boringdon), succeeded his father in 1768 and a year later married Theresa Robinson. Her husband's interests included drinking and gambling but Theresa, her sister, Alice and her brothers Frederick and Thomas took an interest. They advised on the embellishment of the house via correspondence with Theresa. She is crediited with making Saltram a "showpiece of South West England. The six years until Theresa's tragic early death are considered Saltram's golden age. The house owns ten portraits by Joshua Reynolds. Robert Adam was commissioned in 1768 to create the saloon and the library (The library is now the dining room). Adam, created everything from the door handles to the huge plasterwork ceiling. Thomas Chippendale made the furniture and Matthew Boulton made the four candelabras. She and her husband spent £10,000 on the saloon.

Not to be confined to the inside of the property, Boringdon also commissioned Nathaniel Richmond to lay out the present parkland which surrounds the house.

Decline

The third John Parker, later known as Earl of Morley inherited the house just 20 years after his father and took longer again to make any major changes to the house. However, in 1819 he employed the Regency architect John Foulston to add the Entrance Porch and create the present Library out of two smaller rooms. His second wife, Frances, continued to develop the artistic legacy of the family by producing her own watercolours and Old Master copies which are on show in the house still. The Earl of Morley was ambitious and attempted to develop several industrial and engineering projects on the estate, but many of these were unsuccessful and the family fell heavily into debt.

Transference to National Trust

Money was so short that the third Earl of Morley was forced to leave the house between 1861 and 1884, and was only able to return after selling several of the estate's most valuable paintings. The family's fortunes picked up in 1926 when the 4th Earl of Morley inherited several other estates although the good times were short lived as the war brought damage from enemy bombing and eventually in 1951 the house and its contents were accepted in lieu of death duties by H.M. Treasury, which transferred them to the National Trust, which remains in charge to this day.

Landscape

The silting up of the Laira means that once the view to the west was of a muddy estuary for all but the top of the tide, however recent tree growth has created a visually pleasing landscape. The in-filling of the Plymouth refuse dump at Chelson Meadow is now complete, creating green space. Views of Plymouth Sound are possible from the first storey of the house and the castle folly in the gardens.

References

External links

Saltram information at the National Trust

Gardens in Devon
Grade I listed buildings in Devon
Grade I listed houses
Country houses in Devon
National Trust properties in Devon
Museums in Plymouth, Devon
Robert Adam buildings
Historic house museums in Devon